The Procession to Calvary is a video game for Microsoft Windows, macOS, PlayStation 4, Nintendo Switch, Xbox One, and Android by Joe Richardson, released in 2020 and following on from his previous game Four Last Things. The game was released on Xbox Game Pass in October 2021.

References

External links
 

2021 video games
Art games
Christian video games
Parody video games
Point-and-click adventure games
Windows games
Xbox One games
PlayStation 4 games
Nintendo Switch games
Video games developed in the United Kingdom
Video games set in the Crusades
Video games set in the Middle East
Video games set in the Middle Ages